Admiral Sir Pulteney Malcolm  (20 February 1768 – 20 July 1838) was a British naval officer. He was born at Douglan, near Langholm, Scotland, on 20 February 1768, the third son of George Malcolm of Burnfoot, Langholm, in Dumfriesshire, a sheep farmer, and his wife Margaret, the sister of Admiral Sir Thomas Pasley. His brothers were Sir James Malcolm, Sir John Malcolm, and Sir Charles Malcolm.

1778–1793, Midshipman to Lieutenant
In 1782 the Jupiter carried out Admiral Pigot to the West Indies. Malcolm was thus brought under the admiral's notice, was taken by him into the flagship, and some months later, on 3 March 1783, was promoted to be lieutenant of the Jupiter.

He continued serving during the peace, and in 1793, at the beginning of the French Revolutionary Wars, was first lieutenant of the Penelope frigate on the Jamaica station, under the command of Captain Bartholomew Rowley. The Penelope's service was peculiarly active. In company with the Iphigenia she captured the French frigate Inconstante, on the coast of San Domingo, on 25 November 1793; she captured or cut out many privateers or merchant vessels; and Malcolm, as first lieutenant, commanded her boats in several sharp conflicts.

1794–1804, Post-Captain
On 22 October he was posted, and a few days later appointed to the  frigate. In February 1795 he convoyed a fleet of merchant ships to the Mediterranean; thence he went to Quebec, and afterwards was employed for some time in the North Sea. Later on he was sent out to the East Indies, and towards the end of 1797 into the China Seas, under the command of Captain Edward Cooke, in whose company he entered Manila Bay under false colours, on 14 January 1798 in the bloodless Raid on Manila, and carried off three Spanish gunboats. He continued to serve in this capacity during the war. On her homeward passage, in 1803, the Victorious proved exceedingly leaky, and, meeting with heavy weather in the North Atlantic, was with difficulty kept afloat till she reached the Tagus, where she was run ashore and broken up. Malcolm, with the officers and crew, returned to England in two vessels which he chartered at Lisbon.

1804–1805, Battle of Trafalgar
He was, however, almost immediately sent to Naples, where, or in the neighbourhood, he remained during the year. On the return of the fleet to the Channel, the Donegal, with others, was sent to reinforce Collingwood off Cadiz, and was still there when Nelson resumed the command on 28 September.

On 17 October Donegal was sent to Gibraltar for water and a hurried refit. On 20 October Malcolm learnt that the combined fleet was coming out of Cadiz. His ship was then in the Mole, nearly dismantled; but by the greatest exertions he got her out that night, and on 22 October she sailed from Gibraltar with her foreyard towing alongside. It was blowing a gale from the westward, but she succeeded in getting through the Straits, and on the morning of 24 October re-joined the fleet, too late for the battle of Trafalgar, fought on 21 October, but in time to render most valuable assistance to the disabled ships and more disabled prizes. She captured the Rayo, which had made a sally from Cadiz on 23 October; and in the night of 24 October, when some of the prisoners on board the French ship  cut the cable and let her go on shore, on which she almost immediately broke up, the Donegal's boats succeeded in saving a considerable number of her men. She afterwards took charge of the Spanish prize Bahama, and brought her to Gibraltar. Writing to Sir Thomas Pasley on 16 December Collingwood said: "Everybody was sorry Malcolm was not there [sc. at Trafalgar], because everybody knows his spirit, and his skill would have acquired him honour. He got out of the Gut when nobody else could and was of infinite service to us after the action."

1806–1816, Captain to Rear-admiral
The Donegal continued off to cruise off Cadiz till the close of the year, when she sailed for the West Indies with Sir John Duckworth, and took an important part in the Battle of San Domingo, 6 February 1806. Malcolm was afterwards sent home in charge of the prizes, and in a very heavy gale rescued the crew of the Brave as she was on the point of foundering. He received the gold medal for St. Domingo, and was presented by the Patriotic Fund with a vase valued at a hundred guineas. In 1808 he was engaged in convoying troops to the Peninsula, and in 1809, still in the Donegal, was attached to the Channel Fleet, then commanded by Lord Gambier, and took part in the Battle of the Basque Roads. In the summer of 1809 he was called as a witness at the Court-martial of James, Lord Gambier which assessed whether Gambier had failed to support Captain Lord Cochrane at the battle. Gambier was controversially cleared of all charges. In November 1810 Malcolm led an attack on a French frigate squadron anchored at Saint-Vaast-la-Hougue at the action of 15 November 1810, which ultimately led to the destruction of the Elisa.

He was promoted to be rear-admiral on 4 December 1813, but remained with Keith till June 1814, when, with his flag in the Royal Oak, he convoyed a detachment of the army from Bordeaux to North America, and served during the war with the United States as third in command under Sir Alexander Cochrane and Rear-admiral (afterwards Sir) George Cockburn. On 2 January 1815 he was nominated a K.C.B., and during "The Hundred Days' War" commanded a squadron in the North Sea, in co-operation with the army under the Duke of Wellington.

1816–1838, Commander-in-chief
In 1816–17 he was Commander-in-chief on the Saint Helena station, specially appointed to enforce a rigid blockade of the island and to keep a close guard on Napoleon Bonaparte. He was advanced to vice-admiral on 19 July 1821, and Commander-in-Chief, Mediterranean Fleet from 1828 to 1831. In 1832 he commanded on the coast of Holland, with the fleets of France and Spain under his orders; and in 1833–4 was again commander-in-chief in the Mediterranean. He was nominated a G.C.M.G. on 21 January 1829, and a G.C.B. on 26 April 1833.

In the final years of his life, he became Chairman of the Oriental Club which had been founded by his brother General Sir John Malcolm.

He attained the rank of Admiral of the Blue in 1837. He died at East Lodge, Enfield, London, on 20 July 1838.

Personal life
He married, on 18 January 1809, Clementina, eldest daughter of the Hon. William Fullerton Elphinstone, a director of the East India Company, and elder brother of Lord Keith.

Memorials
The post-war Royal Navy frigate  was named after Sir Pulteney Malcolm, as were Pulteney Street, Adelaide and Malcolm Island, British Columbia; the south-west extremity of which is named Pulteney Point.

There is a memorial statue, by Edward Hodges Baily, to Malcolm in the Nelson Chamber of the crypt of St Paul's Cathedral while another statue stands in Langholm.

See also
 Clan Malcolm

References

Attribution
 

|-

1768 births
1838 deaths
Scottish military personnel
Royal Navy admirals
Knights Grand Cross of the Order of the Bath
Knights Grand Cross of the Order of St Michael and St George
Royal Navy personnel of the American Revolutionary War
Royal Navy personnel of the French Revolutionary Wars
Royal Navy personnel of the War of 1812
Royal Navy personnel of the Napoleonic Wars
People from Langholm